The following is a list of the units of the United States Regular Army during the American Civil War.

Infantry
1st Infantry Regiment
2nd Infantry Regiment
3rd Infantry Regiment
4th Infantry Regiment
5th Infantry Regiment
6th Infantry Regiment
7th Infantry Regiment
8th Infantry Regiment
9th Infantry Regiment
10th Infantry Regiment
11th Infantry Regiment
12th Infantry Regiment
13th Infantry Regiment
14th Infantry Regiment
15th Infantry Regiment
16th Infantry Regiment
17th Infantry Regiment
18th Infantry Regiment
19th Infantry Regiment

Cavalry
1st Cavalry Regiment
2nd Cavalry Regiment
3rd Cavalry Regiment
4th Cavalry Regiment
5th Cavalry Regiment
6th Cavalry Regiment

Artillery
1st Artillery Regiment
Battery A
Battery B
Battery C
Battery D
Battery E
Battery F
Battery G
Battery H
Battery I
Battery K
Battery M
2d Artillery Regiment
Battery A
Battery E
Battery G
3d Artillery Regiment
4th Artillery Regiment
Battery A
Battery B
Battery C
Battery E
Battery G
Battery H
Battery I
Battery K
Battery M
5th Artillery Regiment
Battery A
Battery C
Battery D
Battery H
Battery I
Battery K

References
Union Regiments - US Regular Army

See also
Lists of American Civil War Regiments by State

 
Regular
Civil War